Csaba László may refer to:

Csaba László (footballer, born 1964), Romanian-born Hungarian football player and manager currently manager for Chennaiyin FC
Csaba László (footballer, born 1967), Hungarian football player
Csaba László (politician) (born 1962), Hungarian politician, Minister of Finance 2002–2004